Lewis Lapham may refer to:

 Lewis A. Lapham (1909–1995), American shipping and banking executive
 Lewis H. Lapham (born 1935), American writer, son of Lewis A. Lapham
 Lewis Henry Lapham (1858–1934), American entrepreneur, grandfather of Lewis A. Lapham and great-grandfather of Lewis H. Lapham